Tod Culpan "Kip" Williams (born September 27, 1968) is an American director, producer and screenwriter. He is best known for directing the 2010 horror film Paranormal Activity 2.

Life and career
Williams, born in Manhattan in 1968, is the son of architect Tod Williams and dancer Patricia Agnes Jones. His parents divorced when he was three years old, and he and his older sister, model Rachel Williams, lived with their mother in the West Village in Lower Manhattan. After his mother's remarriage in the late 1970s, they moved to Woodstock, New York.

Williams studied painting and literature at Bard College and Columbia University before finding work as a stringer for the New York Times, Los Angeles bureau.  Next, he attended the American Film Institute.

On March 27, 2010, he was named as the director of Paranormal Activity 2; he replaced Kevin Greutert, who was originally set to direct.

Williams was married to actress Famke Janssen from 1995 to 2000. He has been married to actress Gretchen Mol since June 1, 2004. Their first child, a son, was born in September 2007.  Their second child, a daughter, was born in February 2011.

Filmography
The Adventures of Sebastian Cole (1998)
The Door in the Floor (2004)
Wings Over the Rockies (2009)
Paranormal Activity 2 (2010)
Cell (2016)

References

External links

1968 births
Living people
American male screenwriters
Bard College alumni
Columbia University alumni
Film directors from New York City
Horror film directors
Screenwriters from New York (state)
People from Greenwich Village